Begna or Begna bruk is a village in Sør-Aurdal Municipality in Innlandet county, Norway. The European route E16 highway runs along the southern shore of the river, accessible by a nearby bridge. Ringerike Municipality lies on the other side of the border.

The village is the site of a large sawmill which is the largest industrial site in Valdres. The sawmill sells about  worth of lumber each year.

References

Sør-Aurdal
Villages in Innlandet